Wizz Air Abu Dhabi LLC is an Emirati scheduled low-cost airline based at Abu Dhabi International Airport, UAE. The airline is a joint venture with state-owned ADQ (formerly, Abu Dhabi Developmental Holding Company, ADDH), which owns 51 percent with Wizz Air Holdings owning the remaining 49 percent. Flights began in November 2020 with two Airbus A321neo aircraft, rising to 50 over the next few years.

History
On 12 December 2019, it was announced by Wizz Air that it would be setting up a new subsidiary, based at Abu Dhabi International Airport, offering low cost flights from the airport to tap into growth markets across the Middle East, Africa and the Indian subcontinent.

In July 2020, Wizz Air Abu Dhabi announced its initial route network, launching 6 destinations from its base in Abu Dhabi.

In an interview, Jozsef Váradi, CEO of Wizz Air said that the airline's fleet could grow to 100 aircraft in the next 15 years.

The inaugural flight destined for Athens took off from Abu Dhabi International Airport on January 15, 2021.
The second route started between Abu Dhabi and Thessaloniki on February 4, 2021.

Fleet
As of December 2022, the Wizz Air Abu Dhabi fleet consists of the following aircraft:

Destinations

As of March 2023, Wizz Air Abu Dhabi serves these destinations:

These destinations from Abu Dhabi are flown by the sister subsidiary Wizz Air Hungary (W6) and not from Wizz Air Abu Dhabi (5W):
Sofia

Bucharest

Budapest

Cluj-Napoca

Katowice

Kraków

Vienna

Catania

Naples

Rome-Fiumicino

Milan-Malpensa (begins 24 July 2023)

Wizz Air Hungary (W6) formerly operated from these destinations to Abu Dhabi:

 Bari

References

External links

Airlines of the United Arab Emirates
Airlines established in 2019
Low-cost carriers
Emirati companies established in 2019